Minister for Integration may refer to:
 Minister for Integration (Denmark)
 Minister for Integration (Italy)
 Minister for Integration (Sweden)